The Tennessee Volunteers women's cross country program represents the University of Tennessee (UT) located in Knoxville, Tennessee.  The women's program competes in the National Collegiate Athletic Association (NCAA) Division I and the Southeastern Conference (SEC).  The women's cross country team officially started in 1974.

Along with all other UT women's sports teams, it used the nickname "Lady Volunteers" (or the short form "Lady Vols") until the 2015–16 school year, when the school dropped the "Lady" prefix from the nicknames of all women's teams except in basketball. The “Lady Vol” name returned in 2017.

Team history 
The Tennessee Lady Volunteers women's cross country program began competing in 1974 and within three years reached their first AIAW Championship Tournament appearance. The Lady Vols won their first SEC title in 1983 and finished fourth in the NCAA Tournament. Their first head coach was Terry Crawford (1974-1983), who proved to be one of the best in program history. Crawford led the Lady Vols to 3 AIAW Championship appearances, two NCAA Championship appearances, two regional titles, an SEC Championship, and most notably a program high 4th place finish at the 1983 NCAA Championships. Since 2010, the program has struggled to maintain its prior success. Overall, they have failed to record a top 3 SEC finish since 2009, and have failed to qualify for the NCAA Championships in every season since 2006.

J.J. Clark Era 
The most successful coach historically for the Lady Volunteers was J. J. Clark who won three straight conference titles from 2003 to 2005. He came to UT after 10 seasons as the head coach of the Florida Gators women's cross country team from 1992-2002. Under his guidance the Tennessee's Lady Vols won four straight NCAA regionals, and made a program-record five consecutive NCAA Championship appearances. Additionally, Clark is the winningest coach in program history, and won 3 SEC Women's Coach of the Year awards at UT (2003, 2004, 2005). Under Clark 14 female cross country athletes won 31 All-South Region awards and 23 All-SEC honors. Besides his 5 team appearances in the NCAA Championships, Clark saw individuals Jackie Areson (2008, 2009, 2010), Sarah Bowman (2008), Brittany Sheffery (2011), and Katie Van Horn (2009, 2010). His earlier successes wained as he failed to guide the Lady Vols back to the NCAA Championships in each of his final 7 seasons, and failed to record a Top 5 SEC finish in his final 4 XC seasons.

Beth Alford-Sullivan Era 
Under Beth Alford-Sullivan (2014-2021), the Lady Vols rarely found team success. However, Alford-Sullivan guided two time All-American Chelsea Blaase to an individual 2015 SEC runner-up finish, a NCAA South Regional win, and individual NCAA Championship appearances in 2014 (10th) and 2015 (14th). Alford-Sullivan was fired in May 2021 due to poor results across men's and women's XC and track. In 8 seasons under Alford-Sullivan, the Lady Vols finished in the top half of the SEC only three times. Additionally, they never once finished in the top 3 of the SEC or qualified for the NCAA Championships.

Sean Carlson Era 
The Lady Vols are led by first year head coach Sean Carlson who spent 10 years prior to Tennessee as the head coach of the Notre Dame men's cross country and distance teams, in addition to serving as an assistant coach on the women's team. While at Notre Dame, the women's program finished in the top 30 of the NCAA Championships 8 times, and in the top 15 six times. On the men's side, Carlson developed Notre Dame into a national power, winning 3 ACC championships, and finishing in the top 10 of the NCAA Championships during each of his final three seasons. In his final season at Notre Dame, Carlson served as the head coach of the men's track team as well. Former Notre Dame assistant and nationally-recognized recruiter, Nic Jacobsen followed Carlson to Knoxville, and serves as an assistant coach for both distance programs.

Home courses 
The Lambert Acres Golf Club was previously the site of home cross country meets for the Volunteers from 1998-2013. The course still serves as a 27-hole golf course, and is nestled in the foothills of the Great Smoky Mountains and boasts 9,525 yards. Throughout its run, the course hosted the Tennessee Invitational 10 times, the NCAA South Regional in 2002, 2006 and
2008, and Southeastern Conference Championship in 1998. In 2014, the Vols moved much closer to home with the opening of the new Cherokee Farm Cross Country Course on Alcoa highway across the Tennessee River from the main UT campus. The course served as the practice venue for the team in 2014 and 2015, before finally serving in competition for the 2016 season. The course has two loops, one that is 2k and the other is 1k. The course was designed specifically for viewers to use the small loop, where it is ensured that runners have to pass the same point at least three times in a race.

Yearly record

*Through February 2023
 Information Source: 2023 Tennessee Cross Country Record Book – Women's Year-by-Year records

Note: The Lady Vols did not compete in the 2020 SEC Championships due to high COVID-19 cases on the team. In 2020, the season was shortened, and NCAA regionals were not held, as teams advanced straight to the championships.

All-Americans

The Lady Volunteers have a total of 11 women's cross country AIAW/NCAA All-Americans

Valerie Bertrand – 1989
Chelsea Blaase - 2014, 2015
Sarah Bowman – 2008
Kathy Bryant-Hadler – 1980, 1981, 1982
Sharon Dickie – 2000
Jasmin Jones – 1989
Liz Natale – 1983
Linda Portasik – 1980
Alison Quelch – 1983
Brenda Webb – 1977, 1978
Patty Wiegand – 1989

See also 
Tennessee women's track and field
Tennessee men's track and field
Tennessee men's cross country

References

External links
 

Women